The Counter-Terrorist Directorate (best known simply as DIRCOTE) is the branch of the National Police of Peru that is responsible for Peru's anti-terrorist law enforcement.

External links
Official page

Internal conflict in Peru
Law enforcement in Peru